The women's 50 metre freestyle S6 event at the 2016 Paralympic Games took place on 10 September 2016, at the Olympic Aquatics Stadium. Three heats were held. The swimmers with the eight fastest times advanced to the final.

Heat 1 
9:54 10 September 2016:

Heat 2 
9:57 10 September 2016:

Heat 3 
10:00 10 September 2016:

Swim off 
11:39 10 September 2016:

Final

17:50 10 September 2016:

Notes

Swimming at the 2016 Summer Paralympics